Paracles azollae is a moth of the subfamily Arctiinae first described by Berg in 1877. It is found in Argentina.

References

Moths described in 1877
Paracles